The 1932 Kategoria e Dytë is the second season of the second tier of football in Albania. The league was played between April and May 1932 and it was divided into 3 groups, Group A being an exhibition tournament and the winners of Group B and C played each other in the final. The final was played between SK Kavajë and SK Vlorë, which was won by SK Kavajë 3-1 to be crowned champions.

Group A

Played as an exhibition tournament which SK Tirana B won.

Group B

SK Kavajë won the group

Group C

SK Vlorë won the group

Final

Winning team
SK Kavajë

 Ymer Cara
 Ali Cara
 Dervish Cara
 Mustafa Cara
 Seit Shtini
 Mehmet Babamusta
 Dervish Arkaxhiu
 Eqerem Sedja
 Islam Sedja
 Myslim Sedja
 Hysen B
 Kol Çuçja
 Ali Djalja
 Ymer Gjoçi
 Hamdi Hasani
 Idriz Hushi
 Rexhep Kadiu
 Mustafa Mërhori
Coach: Vasip Alushi

References

Kategoria e Parë seasons
Albania
2